The 1979 South Pacific Games was the sixth edition where football was introduced and was held in Fiji during August and September 1979.

Group stage

Group 1

Group 2

Group 3

Group 4

Quarter finals

Semi finals

Bronze medal match

Gold medal match

Consolation Tournament (5th–12th Place)

Quarter finals

Semi finals

Fifth-place match

Goalscorers

External links
Details on RSSSF website

1979
Football at the Pacific Games
Pac
P
1979 Pacific Games